Russia–Arab League relations include various contacts between the Russian Federation and the multi-state Arab organization. The Russian Federation maintains various contacts with the Arab League and plays a mediating role in the Israeli–Palestinian conflict.

Russian-Arab Business Council

The Russian-Arab Business Council is an organization that develops the trade and economic relations between Russia and the Arab countries and provides assistance in establishing business contacts between businessmen. It has already established a Russia-based TV station called Rusiya al Youm (Arabic: روسيا اليوم) meaning Russia Today, in Arabic. It is the first Russian station to be aired in the Arabic language.

Comparison

See also
Soviet Union and the Arab–Israeli conflict
The Soviet Union and the Iran-Iraq War
Russia and the Arab–Israeli conflict
Scheherazade

External links
Russian-Arab Business Council
Russia and the Arab world

Russia
Multilateral relations of Russia